James Leprino (born 1937/38) is an American billionaire, businessman, and chairman of the world's largest manufacturer of mozzarella cheese, Leprino Foods. He was listed as the 265th richest person in the US with a net worth of $3.1 billion, according to the 2017 Forbes 400 list.

Early life
James Leprino was born circa 1938. He is the youngest of five children of Mike Leprino Sr., who emigrated from Italy in 1914, aged 16, settled in Denver, and was a farm worker before starting a grocery store in Denver's Little Italy in 1950.

Career
After graduating from high school in 1956, he worked full-time with his father, but due to pressure from large grocery chains, his father's store closed in 1958, so he started Leprino Foods with $615, focusing on making cheese for pizza, sales of which were booming.

Leprino is the chairman and CEO of Leprino Foods, the largest manufacturer of mozzarella cheese in the world. In October 2017, his net worth was estimated by Forbes at US$3.1 billion.

He supplies major pizza chains including Pizza Hut, Domino's, Papa John's and Little Caesars, and controls up to 85% of the US pizza cheese market.

In 2022, his two nieces, who hold a 25% stake in Leprino Foods, filed a lawsuit claiming they, as minority shareholders, were disfavored in terms of profitability and global management. A dismantlement of the group won't occur.

Personal life
Leprino is married with two children. He resides in Indian Hills, Colorado.

Political lobbying and support
From 1990 to 2017, Leprino Foods contributed $1,521,894 to political lobbying, with 75 to 80 percent of Leprino's political contributions going to Republicans."

References

1930s births
Living people
People from Jefferson County, Colorado
American chief executives
American people of Italian descent
American billionaires
Year of birth missing (living people)
Place of birth missing (living people)